The Villain I Never Was is the debut album of Ghanaian singer, Black Sherif, released on 6 October 2022 through Blacko Management and Empire. The album contains 14 songs, and was supported by five singles, "Soja", "Kwaku the Traveller", a remix of the single "Second Sermon" which features Nigerian artist Burna Boy,"45" and "Konongo Zongo"

Background 

"All of the time I'm the villain – in my story, in people's story – everywhere I'm the villain, but when I sit and think about it I know 'Nah bro, I don't just wake up to be a villain.' I'm fighting for my life, I'm trying to make sense, I'm trying to be a better person so I really wasn't the villain that people paint me to be or that myself is telling me. I'm not the villain."

The Villain I Never Was is 40 minutes long, consisting of 14 songs.

Commercial performance
The album debuted at #12 on the Billboard World Albums Chart

Track listing

Charts

References

2022 debut albums
Hip hop albums by Ghanaian artists